Sekolah Menengah Sains Tuanku Syed Putra (abbreviated SMSTSP; formerly known as Sekolah Menengah Sains Perlis) is a premier boarding school located in Kangar, Perlis, Malaysia. In 2010, the school was awarded the Sekolah Berprestasi Tinggi or High Performance School award, a title awarded to the 20 schools in Malaysia that have met stringent criteria including academic achievement, strength of alumni, international recognition, network and linkages.

The school specialises in soccer, innovation and invention. The school performance in the recent Penilaian Menengah Rendah (2013) is the best in Perlis and fourteenth ranking in Sekolah Berasrama Penuh with 76.92% students gaining straight A's with GPS 1.0526 while Sijil Pelajaran Malaysia is the best in Perlis with 30 students obtaining straight A's.

References

External links 
 Asputra website

Educational institutions established in 1973
1973 establishments in Malaysia
Co-educational boarding schools